Una limosna de amor is a Mexican telenovela produced by Patricia Lozano for Televisa in 1981.

Cast 
Liliana Abud as Daniela
José Alonso as Luis Alfonso
Tony Carbajal as Silvio
Rita Macedo as Emma
Jorge Ortiz de Pinedo as Leonidas
Rafael Banquells as Elias
Luis Uribe as Gerardo
Amparo Grisales as Julia
Miguel Suárez as Don Jorge
Lilia Aragón as Angela
Raúl Méraz as Mora
José Carlos Ruiz as Jeremias
Rosa Furman as Ana
Gustavo Rojo as Rolando
Gloria Silva as Prudencia
Alfonso Iturralde as Raúl
Francisco del Toro
Jorge Mateos
Anabel Ferreira as Patty

References

External links 

Mexican telenovelas
1981 telenovelas
Televisa telenovelas
Spanish-language telenovelas
1981 Mexican television series debuts
1981 Mexican television series endings